London Forest was a subsidiary of London Buses that operated services between April 1989 and November 1991.

History
London Forest was formed as one of the eleven operating units of London Buses in readiness for privatisation. It commenced operating on 1 April 1989, being managed by Tom Young, who had previously worked for Midland Red North before moving to London Transport. The company employed around 1,300 staff and owned 370 buses.

The company initially operated from garages in Ash Grove, Walthamstow and Leyton on a network of routes in North-East London. Clapton garage was later added: this had been closed in 1987, but reopened as an outstation of Leyton and later regained full depot status. The company's logo was a stylised image of an oak tree.

Forest was wound up in 1991 when the tenders to operate eleven routes in the Walthamstow area were won on the basis of reduced costs. A proposed wage cut and closure of Leyton garage led to strike action which saw the routes lost. Walthamstow garage was closed, and the remaining garages and operations taken over by other London Buses subsidiaries.
 
In May 1991, all 11 London Forest routes in the Walthamstow area came up for re-tendering. Forest won the contracts to operate all of the routes, but found that it had bid too low for the work and was forced to cut wages. Reports differ as to the cut proposed, with 9.5%, 18% 21% and no pay cut if a 20% increase in the working week was accepted all suggested. London Forest's management also announced that they intended to close Leyton garage.

In July 1991, all of the company's 1,300 staff at its four garages went out on strike against these changes, leading to the suspension of services for two weeks. This was the first official strike by London bus drivers since 1958, and prompted Harry Cohen, the Member of Parliament for Leyton, to issue an Early day motion in the House of Commons. The company was forced to abandon the routes, with work taken on by Country Bus & Coach, Ensignbus and Thamesway.

Ensignbus, whose bus operations had recently been acquired by Hong Kong operator Citybus, used the opportunity to launch a new brand, Capital Citybus on the routes it had won. Following the loss of these routes it was announced that Walthamstow garage, operational since 1905, would close; Leyton was retained in its place, initially temporarily.

Tom Young resigned as Managing Director of London Forest on 20 August 1991. Despite the fact that the company still had three garages and 250 buses, London Transport decided that London Forest would be wound up on 21 November 1991. Ash Grove garage was also closed and its routes split between other London Transport subsidiaries in the area, while Leyton was transferred to the East London division and Clapton to Leaside Buses.

Legacy
Following the closure of London Forest, no large packages of tenders were offered at once by London Buses. Ash Grove garage reopened in 1994 for temporary use by Kentish Bus, and reopened fully in 2000 with the formation of East Thames Buses. East Thames later moved to another site, with CT Plus moving in. Arriva London operated former Forest route 38 from the garage between 2005 and 2009. Walthamstow garage never reopened and was redeveloped as housing, although the office building remains. Tom Young went on to operate West Midlands independent Choice Travel.

Further reading

References

Former London bus operators
1989 establishments in England
1991 disestablishments in England